The sixteen national teams involved in the 2019 CONCACAF Gold Cup were required to register a squad of 23 players; only players in these squads were eligible to take part in the tournament.
CONCACAF published all provisional lists on 20 May. The final list of 23 players per national team was submitted to CONCACAF by June 2019. Three players per national team had to be goalkeepers.

The statistics in the tables below represent player profiles as of the beginning of the tournament. See individual player articles for current statistics. The club listed is the club for which the player last played a competitive match prior to the tournament. The nationality for each club reflects the national association (not the league) to which the club is affiliated.

Group A

Mexico
Head coach:  Gerardo Martino

The 29-man provisional squad was announced on 14 May 2019. On 26 May and 27 May, defender Miguel Layún and forward Hirving Lozano were ruled out for medical reasons, therefore, provisional squad was reduced to 27 players. The 23-man final squad was announced on 5 June 2019. On 14 June 2019, Uriel Antuna replaced the injured Jorge Sánchez.

Canada
Head coach:  John Herdman

The 40-man provisional squad was announced on 20 May 2019. The 23-man final squad was announced on 30 May 2019.

Martinique
Head coach: Mario Bocaly

The preliminary squad was announced on 28 May 2019, Gregory Eneleda replaced to Wesley Jobello. The final squad was announced on 7 June 2019.

Cuba
Head coach: Raúl Mederos

The final squad was announced on 7 June 2019. Yordan Santa Cruz did not travel, but remained in the official list. Yasmany López defected following Cuba's opening match. Daniel Luis, Reynaldo Perez, Luismel Morris defected after second game.

Group B

Costa Rica
Head coach:  Gustavo Matosas

The 40-man provisional squad was announced on 20 May 2019. The 23-man final squad was announced on 5 June 2019. The squad was reduced to 22 players after Jimmy Marín left the team without permission in order to sign with Hapoel Be'er Sheva, but remained in the official list.

Haiti
Head coach:  Marc Collat

The 40-man provisional squad was announced on 16 May 2019. The 23-man final squad was announced on 23 May 2019.

Nicaragua
Head coach:  Henry Duarte

The 40-man provisional squad was announced on 20 May 2019. The 23-man final squad was announced on 3 June 2019. Marlon Lopez, Carlos Montenegro, Carlos Chavarria expelled from the team after first mach.

Bermuda
Head coach: Kyle Lightbourne

The final squad was announced on 31 May 2019.

Group C

Honduras
Head coach:  Fabián Coito

The 40-man provisional squad was announced on 20 May 2019. The 23-man final squad was announced on 6 June 2019. On 10 June, defender Andy Najar withdrew injured and was replaced by José Reyes.

Jamaica
Head coach: Theodore Whitmore

The final squad was announced on 7 June 2019.

El Salvador
Head coach:  Carlos de los Cobos

The 39-man provisional squad was announced on 20 May 2019. The 23-man final squad was announced on 28 May 2019.

Curaçao
Head coach: Remko Bicentini

The final squad was announced on 7 June 2019. Kenji Gorré replaced Gervane Kastaneer.

Group D

United States
Head coach: Gregg Berhalter

The 40-man provisional squad was announced on 20 May 2019. The final 23-man squad was announced on 5 June. On 11 June, the injured Tyler Adams was replaced by Reggie Cannon. On 15 June, the injured Duane Holmes was replaced by Djordje Mihailovic.

Panama
Head coach: Julio Dely Valdés

The 40-man provisional squad was announced on 20 May 2019. The 23-man final squad was announced on 4 June 2019. Ernesto Walker later replaced Aníbal Godoy.

Trinidad and Tobago
Head coach: Dennis Lawrence

The 40-man provisional squad was announced on 20 May 2019. The 23-man final squad was announced on 5 June 2019. Aubrey David remplaced to Leland Archer.

Guyana
Head coach:  Michael Johnson

The 40-man provisional squad was announced on 20 May 2019. The final squad was announced on 30 May 2019. On 13 June, the injured Warren Creavalle was replaced by Brandon Beresford.

Statistics

Age
All ages are set to 15 June 2019, the opening day of the tournament.

Players
Oldest:  Álvaro Saborío
Youngest:  Karel Espino

Goalkeepers
Oldest:  Justo Lorente
Youngest:  Josué Duverger

Captains
Oldest:  Maynor Figueroa
Youngest:  Yordan Santa Cruz

Player representation

By club
Clubs are ordered alphabetically: first by country, then by club name.

By club nationality

By club confederation

References

CONCACAF Gold Cup squads
Squads